Brachistus is a genus of flowering plants belonging to the family Solanaceae.

Its native range is Mexico to Central America.

Species:

Brachistus knappiae 
Brachistus nelsonii 
Brachistus stramoniifolius

References

Solanaceae
Solanaceae genera